Joseph Trimpont (born 24 September 1918, date of death unknown) was a Belgian wrestler. He competed at the 1948 Summer Olympics and the 1952 Summer Olympics.

References

External links
 

1918 births
Date of death unknown
Year of death missing
Belgian male sport wrestlers
Olympic wrestlers of Belgium
Wrestlers at the 1948 Summer Olympics
Wrestlers at the 1952 Summer Olympics
Sportspeople from Brussels
20th-century Belgian people